Ballaarat Old Cemetery is a cemetery located in the rural city of Ballarat, Victoria in Australia. The cemetery dates back to 1856, although records show burials took place in the area from the late 1840s.

Eureka Rebellion memorials to soldiers and miners are located in this cemetery.

Notable interments
 John Basson Humffray, politician
 William James McAdam, politician
 Alfred Ronalds, fly fishing author and artisan
 Captain Henry Ross, gold miner
 James Scobie, murdered Scottish gold digger
 John La Gerche, one of Creswick's first foresters
 Ellen Young, poetess

War graves
The cemetery contains the war graves of 6 Commonwealth service personnel. There are 5 from World War I and 1 from World War II.

Note
The archaic spelling of Ballaarat has been used on the official Ballaarat General Cemeteries website.

See also
 Ballaarat New Cemetery

References

External links
 Ballarat Old Cemetery – Billion Graves
 Ballarat Old General Cemetery Australian cemeteries
 

1856 establishments in Australia
Cemeteries in Victoria (Australia)
Ballarat